Wieslaw Cisek (born 2 January 1963) is a Polish former professional footballer who played as a midfielder.

References

Living people
1963 births
People from Radymno
Polish footballers
Association football midfielders
Poland international footballers
2. Bundesliga players
Resovia (football) players
Legia Warsaw players
Widzew Łódź players
VfL Oldenburg players
Polish expatriate footballers
Polish expatriate sportspeople in Germany
Expatriate footballers in Germany